Redwood is a rural locality on the outskirts of Toowoomba in the Toowoomba Region, Queensland, Australia.

Geography 
Half of the suburb's area consists of the  bushland Redwood Park, after which the suburb was named in 1981; the rest, to the south of the highway, is mostly crown land.

The Warrego Highway which connects Ipswich to Toowoomba and towns west of Toowoomba passes through Redwood using the Old Tollbar Road and the Toowoomba Connection Road. This was the major road access over the Great Dividing Range to/from Toowoomba until September 2019 when the Toowoomba Bypass Road (informally known as the Toowoomba Second Range Crossing) opened to the north-east of Toowoomba.

History 
In 2006, the locality had a SEIFA score of 1171, placing it ahead of all other localities in the district.

In the 2011 census, Redwood had a population of 17 people.

Heritage listings 

The locality is home to the heritage-listed Glen Alpine villa at 32-36 East Street.

References

Suburbs of Toowoomba
Localities in Queensland